This is a list of the Permanent Representatives of Belarus to the United Nations. Permanent Representative is the head of the permanent mission of Belarus to the United Nations. The current officeholder is Valentyn Rybakov, since August 7, 2017.

History 
26 June 1945 was signed the Charter of the United Nations and came into force on 24 October 1945. The Byelorussian Soviet Socialist Republic was among the first countries that signed the United Nations Charter, becoming a founding member of the United Nations among 51 countries.

Until 1958, the permanent mission of Byelorussia was led by the Minister of Foreign Affairs rather than the permanent representative.

Since Belarus's independence in August 1991, membership in the United Nations is a priority of Belarusine's foreign policy.

Permanent Mission Composition
The permanent mission of Belarus consists of permanent representative, three counsellors (one of which is a permanent representative deputy) and a military adviser. The permanent mission also includes about 10 various secretaries and attaches.

Permanent Representatives of the Republic of Belarus to the United Nations

References

Belarus